Rajarampalli is a village in Endapalli Mandal in Jagityal District of Telangana State, India. It belongs to Telangana region. The local language is Telugu.

References 

Villages in Karimnagar district